Dumbrella is an alliance of webcomic artists who promote one another's sites, travel to conventions, and sell merchandise together. It is also the name of the website of that alliance, which serves as a shared weblog. 

The current members of the Dumbrella alliance are:
Andrew Bell: The Creatures in my Head
Jeffrey Rowland: Wigu, Overcompensating 
Jonathan Rosenberg: Goats
John Allison: Scary Go Round, Bad Machinery 
R. Stevens: Diesel Sweeties
Sam Brown: Explodingdog
Steven Cloud: Boy on a Stick and Slither

Dumbrella Hosting
As of 2006, Phillip Karlsson is no longer formally part of Goats, but has instead formed Dumbrella Hosting, a web hosting service for webcomic artists.  Current clients include Goats, Overcompensating, Real Life, Sheldon, Courting Disaster, Phables, and Dinosaur Comics. Dumbrella Hosting also hosts the webcomic search engine Oh No Robot, the auction-based ad serving system Project Wonderful, and the webcomic review blog Fleen. Dumbrella Hosting was discontinued early June 2013.

References

External links 
 
DumbWiki

Webcomic collectives